Arthur Shapton Richards (1877 – 5 August 1947) was a New Zealand politician of the Labour Party.

Biography

Early life
He was born in Reading, Berkshire, England and came to New Zealand in 1894, first at Gisborne and then Poverty Bay where he worked on sheep farms. In 1903 he married Elizabeth  Warneford. He briefly moved to Wanganui in 1908 where he founded Wanganui Branch of New Zealand Socialist Party before returning to Gisborne where he became President of East Coast Trades Council and was also Secretary of Gisborne Hotel Workers' Union from 1911 to 1917. He was Gisborne Drivers' Union delegate to the 1913 Unity Congress. In 1922 he moved to Auckland.

Political career

Richards unsuccessfully stood for the Auckland City Council on a Labour ticket in the 1923 local elections.

He held Roskill until 1946, when he successfully transferred to the "safe" (for Labour)  electorate in the 1946 general election.

Following an electoral redistribution the Roskill electorate remained, but 75% of its area became the new Mount Albert electorate. Consequently Richards thought that Mount Albert would be the more suitable electorate for him to represent. He won selection over Martyn Finlay, Tom Skinner and Frank Langstone (Langstone would in turn replace Richards in Roskill). He died in office on 5 August 1947.

He was the senior Government whip from 1942 until his death, and was succeeded in that position by his deputy, Robert Macfarlane.

He was awarded the King George V Silver Jubilee Medal in 1935.

Death
Richards died on 5 August 1947 after an illness extending over several weeks. He was survived by his wife, son and two daughters.

In recognition of Richards' work in establishing state housing in Mount Roskill, Auckland, the Arthur S Richards Memorial Park was named in his honour.

Notes

References

1877 births
1947 deaths
New Zealand Labour Party MPs
English emigrants to New Zealand
Members of the New Zealand House of Representatives
New Zealand MPs for Auckland electorates
People from Reading, Berkshire
Unsuccessful candidates in the 1928 New Zealand general election
Unsuccessful candidates in the 1922 New Zealand general election
Unsuccessful candidates in the 1925 New Zealand general election